Marjorie M. Liu is an American New York Times best-selling author and comic book writer. She is acclaimed for her horror fantasy comic Monstress, and her paranormal romance and urban fantasy novels including The Hunter Kiss and Tiger Eye series. Her work for Marvel Comics includes NYX, X-23, Dark Wolverine, and Astonishing X-Men. In 2015 Image Comics debuted her creator-owned series Monstress, for which she was nominated for an Eisner Award for Best New Series. In 2017 she won a Hugo Award for the first Monstress trade paperback collection. In July 2018 she became the first woman in the 30-year history of the Eisner Awards to win the Eisner Award for Best Writer for her work on Monstress.

Early life
Marjorie M. Liu was born in Philadelphia, and grew up in Seattle, Washington. Her father is Taiwanese, while her mother is an American of French, Scottish and Irish descent. She developed an early love of reading, from books such as Laura Ingalls Wilder's Little House on the Prairie books, and the works of Robert Louis Stevenson, Joseph Campbell, Charles de Lint and Jorge Luis Borges.

Liu majored in East Asian Languages and Cultures and minored in Biomedical Ethics at Lawrence University in Appleton, Wisconsin. During her undergraduate years, she practiced her web design skills by designing a fan site called The Wolverine and Jubilee page, after her discovery of numerous X-Men fan sites that she admired. Although she had never read comic books as a child, she was familiar with the X-Men through the animated TV series and via fan fiction. She first purchased X-Men and Wolverine comics for reference for her fanfic from Powerhouse Comics in Appleton, Wisconsin. Writing fanfic helped her improve her storytelling skills.

After graduating, she attended law school at the University of Wisconsin, as she was impressed with their East Asian legal center, and the presence of top U.S. experts in Biotech Law on the University's faculty. She found an internship in Beijing working at the Foreign Agriculture Service at the U.S. Embassy, which at the time, was dealing with the Chinese government's new rules regarding the import of genetically modified food. She graduated in May 2003, and was soon admitted to the bar.

Career

Despite enjoying law school, Liu was disillusioned with the life of a lawyer. Instead she decided to become a writer. She published poetry, short stories, and non-fiction pieces, then submitted her first novel, a paranormal romantic adventure set in China and the United States entitled Tiger Eye. She wrote it in one month. She submitted it to several publishers before it was acquired by Dorchester, and published in November 2007. She wrote a sequel to Tiger Eye, then produced A Taste of Crimson, the sequel to Liz Maverick's Crimson City, which was published in August 2005.

After seeing a little boy dressed as Spider-Man at a book convention in Tucson, Arizona, Liu told her former literary agent Lucienne Diver that she would enjoy writing for Marvel Comics. Diver, who knew a Marvel acquisition editor seeking authors for Marvel tie-in novels at Pocket Books, made inquiries. Pocket had already hired enough authors for the Spider-Man books, but they had not hired anyone to write tie-in novels for the X-Men.

Liu produced the X-Men novel Dark Mirror for Pocket in 2005, but it was three years before that she landed her first comics assignment at Marvel, the X-Men spin-off NYX. She served as co-writer on Marvel's Daken: Dark Wolverine with Daniel Way, and wrote the X-23 series, which ended with #21.

Liu wrote the final 21 issues for Marvel's Astonishing X-Men series with artist Mike Perkins from 2012 to 2013. The series received media attention for featuring Marvel Comics' first gay wedding between Northstar and longterm partner Kyle in issue #51 (August 2012). According to Marvel Comics editor-in-chief Axel Alonso, the issue comes as a response to real-world legalization of same sex marriage in New York. Liu was nominated for a GLAAD Media Award in 2013.

In 2015, Liu taught a course at MIT on comic book writing and participated at the VONA/VOICES Workshop as guest lecturer at UC Berkeley for popular fiction.

In 2015 Image Comics debuted Liu's comics series, Monstress, which gained wide publicity for its exploration of racism, the effects of war, and feminism.

In July 2018 Liu became the first woman in the 30-year history of the Eisner Awards to win the Eisner Award for Best Writer for her work on Monstress. She shared the award with writer Tom King, who received it for his work on  Batman books and Mister Miracle.

Personal life
As of December 2012 Liu had been in a relationship with author Junot Díaz for approximately a year, and living with him in Cambridge, Massachusetts.

Writings

Novels

Dirk & Steele series

Hunter Kiss
{| class="wikitable"
!#
!Title
!Also In
!Publication Date
|-
|1
|The Iron Hunt
|
|2008
|-
|2
|Darkness Calls
|
|2008
|-
|2.5
|Hunter Kiss
|Wild Thing
|May 2007
|-
|2.6
|Armor of Roses 
|Inked

Armor of Roses and the Silver Voice
|Jan 2010
|-
|3
|A Wild Light
|
|Jul 2010
|-
|3.5
|The Silver Voice
|Armor of Roses and the Silver Voice'''
|Dec 2011
|-
|4
|The Mortal Bone|
|2011
|-
|5
|Labyrinth of Stars|
|2014
|}

 Other novels 
 A Taste of Crimson: Crimson City, Book 2 (2005)
 X-Men: Dark Mirror (2005)

 Short fiction 

ComicsNYX: No Way Home #1 - 6 (Marvel Comics, 2008–2009)Dark Wolverine #75 - 90 (co-written with Daniel Way, Marvel Comics, 2009–2010)X-23 Vol. 2 #1- Women of Marvel one-shot (Marvel Comics, 2010)Black Widow Vol. 4 #1 - 5 (Marvel Comics, 2010)Girl Comics #3 (Wolverine & Jubilee story only, Marvel Comics, 2010)Wolverine: Road to Hell - one-shot (Marvel Comics, 2010)Daken: Dark Wolverine #1 - 9 (co-written with Daniel Way, Marvel Comics, 2010–2011) (continuation of Dark Wolverine)X-23 Vol. 3 #1 - 21 (Marvel Comics, 2010–2012)Jim Henson's Storyteller ("Puss in Boots", Archaia, 2013)Astonishing X-Men Vol. 3 #48 - #68, (Marvel Comics, 2012–2013)X-Termination #1 (Marvel Comics, 2013)X-Treme X-Men Vol. 2 #13 (Marvel Comics, 2013)Legends of Red Sonja #4 (Dynamite, 2014)Monstress (Image Comics, 2015-)Star Wars: Han Solo (Marvel Comics, 2016)The Night Eaters (Abrams, 2022)

Nonfiction
 "Ghost" in The Secret Lives of Geek Girls'' (2015) edited by Hope Nicholson

Awards and nominations

References

External links 

 
 
 Off The Shelf Podcast Interview
 The Wolverine and Jubilee Page, accessed December 29, 2010.  — Fan site designed by Marjorie Liu.

Living people
21st-century American novelists
American women novelists
American women writers of Chinese descent
American writers of Taiwanese descent
American writers of Chinese descent
American romantic fiction writers
American novelists of Asian descent
American people of French descent
American people of Irish descent
American people of Scottish descent
Fan fiction writers
Hugo Award-winning writers
American lawyers
American women lawyers
Women romantic fiction writers
21st-century American women writers
Lawrence University alumni
Eisner Award winners for Best Writer
American female comics artists
Year of birth missing (living people)